The Aisne-Marne American Cemetery and Memorial is a  World War I cemetery in Belleau, Northern France. It is located at the foot of the hill where the Battle of Belleau Wood was fought, with many American fatalities. The cemetery also contains burials from the Battle of Château-Thierry, later that summer.

The site is maintained by the American Battle Monuments Commission, and its dedication ceremony was held on Memorial Day, May 30, 1937. Among those buried there are  Medal of Honor recipient Weedon Osborne.

The grounds include both the Château-Thierry American Monument and a monument to US Marines.

Cemetery
The cemetery itself is laid out in the form of the capital letter T, with the Memorial Chapel crowning the T-shape on a small hill to south, the cross-bars making up the two burial plots and the pathway leading into the cemetery making up the stem of the letter-shape.

Each of the two burial plots (Plot A and Plot B) contain 13 rows of headstones, which consist of either Stars of David or Latin crosses. There are 2,289 burials in the cemetery, 250 of which contain unknown remains.

Memorial Chapel
The Memorial Chapel is built over the site of front-line battle trenches dug in defense of Belleau Wood. When entering the Memorial Chapel, one can see on the wall to the right a small hole that was made by a passing German anti-tank gun. Looking above the inside entrance door, one will see the following inscription:

The names of 1,060 soldiers missing in action are inscribed on the Chapel's walls.

Notable burials
 US Navy Lt. (j.g.) Weedon E. Osborne (1892–1918), recipient of the Medal of Honor

Gallery

See also
 World War I memorials

References

External links

 Aisne-Marne American Cemetery, American Battle Monuments Commission
 Cemetery booklet
 
 

World War I memorials in France
World War I cemeteries in France
American Battle Monuments Commission
Ralph Adams Cram buildings